Two ships of the Royal Navy have borne the name HMS Meynell:

  was a  minesweeper launched in 1917 and sold in 1922. 
  was a  launched in 1940, sold to Ecuador in 1954 and renamed in 1955 as Presidente Valesco Ibarra. She was stricken in 1978.

Royal Navy ship names